Bülow or Bulow is a surname; notable people with this name include:

People
Bülow family, a noble family from Germany (has links to Wikipedia articles of family members named "von Bülow")
bülow (singer), or Megan Bülow (born 1999), German-Canadian singer
Aadel Bülow-Hansen (1906–2001), Norwegian physiotherapist
Alexander Bülow (1905–unknown), SS guard
Anders Bülow (born 1994), Danish cricketer
Anna Bülow (died 1519), Swedish writer and translator
Bernhard von Bülow (1849–1929), German statesman
Bernhard-Viktor Christoph-Carl von Bülow German cartoonist
David Bulow (1980–2021), American soccer player
Hans von Bülow (1830–1894), German conductor, pianist, and composer
Johan Bülow Wamberg (1786–1852), Norwegian politician
Kai Bülow (born 1986), German footballer
Karen Bulow (1899–1982), Danish-Canadian artist
Karl von Bülow (1846–1921), German field marshal
Marco Bülow (born 1971), German politician
Melissa Bulow (born 1980), Australian cricketer
Vivianna Torun Bülow-Hübe (1927–2004), Swedish silversmith
William J. Bulow (1869–1960), United States Senator, Governor of South Dakota

Places
Bülow, Germany, a municipality in the district of Parchim, Mecklenburg-Vorpommern, Germany
Bulow Creek State Park, Florida State park near Ormond Beach
Bulow Plantation Ruins Historic State Park, Florida State Park in Flagler Beach
Bulows Minde, United States Virgin Islands, settlement on Saint Croix, US Virgin Islands

See also
Arrigo Boldrini (1915–2008), Italian resistance leader, was known by his nom de guerre Bulow
The Love Bülow, German indie rap band